Paul Stuart Scully (born 29 April 1968) is a British politician serving as Minister for London since February 2020 and Parliamentary Under-Secretary of State for Tech and the Digital Economy since October 2022. A member of the Conservative Party, he has served as the Member of Parliament (MP) for Sutton and Cheam since 2015.

Scully served as Vice Chairman of the Conservative Party for the London region from 2017 to 2019, having been appointed by Theresa May to replace Stephen Hammond who had the Conservative whip withdrawn for rebelling against the government over the EU withdrawal bill. After Boris Johnson was appointed Prime Minister in July 2019, Scully was promoted to Deputy Chairman of the Conservative Party. He was appointed Parliamentary Under-Secretary of State for Small Business, Consumers and Labour Markets and Minister for London in the February 2020 reshuffle. In July 2022, he became Minister of State at the Department for Levelling Up, Housing and Communities.

Early life
Scully was born in Rugby, Warwickshire on 29 April 1968. His father's family was originally from Burma. He was privately educated at Bedford School in Bedfordshire and the University of Reading. He moved to London after graduating and ran a number of small businesses. Scully joined the Conservative Party after the 1997 general election. He had previously voted for the Referendum Party, a Eurosceptic, single-issue political party that was active in the United Kingdom from 1994 to 1997.

Political career

Local government

Scully unsuccessfully stood as a Conservative candidate in the Wallington South ward of the London Borough of Sutton Council elections in 2002, but was subsequently elected in the Carshalton Central ward in 2006. He was the Leader of the Opposition on Sutton Council for three of his four years as a councillor. Scully lost his seat to the Liberal Democrats at the following local election in 2010.

In addition to his work as a local councillor, Scully worked as a parliamentary aide for Conservative MPs Andrew Pelling, Shailesh Vara and Alok Sharma, and set up a public relations company called Nudge Factory Ltd in 2011.

Member of Parliament
Scully was selected as the Conservative Party candidate for the marginal Sutton and Cheam seat at the 2015 general election. The constituency is part of the borough in which he had been a councillor. Scully defeated the Liberal Democrat incumbent, Paul Burstow, who had represented the seat since 1997, and was elected as its Member of Parliament (MP). Scully was re-elected at the 2017 general election.

In September 2017, he was appointed as the Prime Minister's Trade Envoy to Brunei, Thailand and Burma and was the Parliamentary Private Secretary to Baroness Evans, the Leader of the House of Lords between November 2017 and January 2018. He is "very proud" of his Burmese heritage. In a parliamentary debate on 22 October 2015, he stated, "I am, I believe, the first Member of the British Parliament to be of Burmese heritage."

He visited Myanmar for the first time in February 2016. He has been active in human rights issues in Burma, especially the Rohingya refugee situation and is the Co-Chair of the All-Party Parliamentary Group for Burma. He has written about his experience of being one of the first British MPs to visit the Kutupalong refugee camp during the 2017 mass movement.

He campaigned for a Leave vote in the 2016 EU referendum, and was a supporter of the campaign group Leave Means Leave.

In May 2016, it was reported that Scully was one of a number of Conservative MPs being investigated by police in the United Kingdom general election, 2015 party spending investigation, for allegedly spending more than the legal limit on constituency election campaign expenses. In May 2017, the Crown Prosecution Service said that, while there was evidence of inaccurate spending returns, it did not "meet the test" for further action.

In June 2017, comments made by Scully at an election hustings event and on a regional BBC politics programme relating to building a new hospital in Sutton were criticised by health campaigners as representing an acceptance of closing some existing local medical facilities, such as the St Helier Hospital. Scully said that he was still committed to retaining facilities at the St Helier Hospital, where he had previously volunteered.

On 15 December 2017, Scully was confirmed as the Conservative Party's new Vice Chairman for London, following the sacking of Stephen Hammond two days earlier for his failure to vote with the Government on a key vote relating to the United Kingdom departing the European Union. He helped manage the Conservative Party's campaign in the 2018 London local elections, in which the party registered their lowest ever number of seats in the capital, but made a number of gains on Sutton Council.

Scully was re-elected in Sutton and Cheam at the 2019 general election, albeit on a slightly reduced vote share.

In February 2020, Scully joined the Department for Business, Energy and Industrial Strategy as the Parliamentary Under-Secretary of State for Small Business, Consumers and Labour Markets, succeeding Kelly Tolhurst. He was also appointed to the position of Minister for London, succeeding Chris Philp.

In July 2021, in response to a question about vaccine passports, Scully described himself as a libertarian conservative.

On 22 October 2021, Scully talked out a bill which would outlaw the practice of sacking employees and hiring them back on worse terms and conditions, which resulted in the bill failing. Scully said that he did not disagree with the intent of the bill, but did not think it was the best means to achieve it. He said: "The unambiguous message is that bully-boy tactics of fire-and-rehire, for use as a negotiating tactic, is absolutely inappropriate."

On 7 July 2022, he was appointed a Minister at the Department for Levelling Up, Housing and Communities as part of the caretaker government by outgoing Prime Minister Johnson, succeeding Kemi Badenoch. Scully remained in this role and as Minister for London in the Truss ministry. In October 2022, under Prime Minister Rishi Sunak, Scully was appointed as Parliamentary Under-Secretary of State for Tech and the Digital Economy. He also remained in his post as Minister for London.

Personal life
Scully is divorced and has two grown-up children.

References

External links

1968 births
Alumni of the University of Reading
British people of Burmese descent
British politicians of Burmese descent
Conservative Party (UK) MPs for English constituencies
English people of Burmese descent
Living people
People educated at Bedford School
UK MPs 2015–2017
UK MPs 2017–2019
UK MPs 2019–present